Fagerfjell  is a mountain in the municipality of Flesberg in Buskerud, Norway.

References

Flesberg
Mountains of Viken